Cornhill was a street in Boston, Massachusetts, in the 18th, 19th and 20th centuries, located on the site of the current City Hall Plaza in Government Center. It was named in 1829; previously it was known as Market Street (1807–1828). In its time, it comprised a busy part of the city near Brattle Street, Court Street and Scollay Square. In the 19th century, it was the home of many bookstores and publishing companies.  As of 1969, Cornhill exists as 144 feet along the edge of City Hall Plaza.



See also
 City Hall Plaza
 Sears' Crescent building (built 1816) 100 City Hall Plaza; formerly 38–68 Cornhill)
 Sears' Block (built 1848) corner Court + Washington St., formerly 70–72 Cornhill

Previous tenants of Cornhill
 Annin & Smith, 19th-century engravers
 Iver Johnson Sporting Goods Company, Located in the Iver Johnson Building, corner of Washington Street and Cornhill
 Daniel Clement Colesworthy, bookseller, c. 1850s
 Frost & Adams, art supplies
 The Liberator (anti-slavery newspaper), published by Isaac Knapp, Cornhill, c. 1837
 Bela Marsh, 19th century publisher
 F. T. Somerby, painter

References

Further reading
 "Old Boston Booksellers: The Three Burnham Brothers and Their Antecedents". The New York Times, July 21, 1893. p. 6, col. 3. (Mentions Samuel B. Drake and Burnham Brothers, booksellers.)
 "Booksellers of Cornhill: 1828-1865" by Alan Seaburg. Published by The Anne Miniver Press (2017). On-line Dropbox edition can be accessed at: anneminiverpress.com

External links

 Bostonian Society has materials related to the street.
 G. Kepes. Photo of Scollay Square from Pemberton Square Looking Across to Cornhill Street, 1957.
 Flickr. Sears Crescent, 1999
 Flickr. Sears Crescent, 2008
 Flickr. Photo, 2009

1829 establishments in Massachusetts
19th century in Boston
20th century in Boston
Former buildings and structures in Boston
Government Center, Boston
Streets in Boston